The Cui clan of Qinghe (清河崔氏) was an eminent Chinese family of high-ranking government officials and Confucian scholars. The clan's ancestral home was in Qinghe Commandery (清河郡), which covered parts of present-day Shandong and Hebei provinces.

The first notable member of this clan, according to the New Book of Tang, was Cui Ye (崔業), who held the peerage of Marquis of Donglai (東萊候) during the  Han dynasty.

The Cui clans of Boling and Qinghe both traced their ancestry to a common ancestor, Cui Ming, an official who lived in the Spring and Autumn period. Cui Lin, a high-ranking minister of the Cao Wei state in the Three Kingdoms period, was from the Cui family of Qinghe, as was his relative Cui Yan, a notable official who served in the administration of the Imperial Chancellor Cao Cao in the late Eastern Han dynasty. Cui Yan's niece, Cuishi, married the prince of the state of Cao Wei and famous poet, Cao Zhi. Another female member of the Cui clan of Qinghe married Liu Kun.

The Liu clan of Zhongshan, Lu clan of Luyang and Cui family of Qinghe formed a network. The Cui clan expanded its power over many official positions during the Northern Wei dynasty through political marriages, and became one of the four clans of northern China at the time. Cui Hao was also from the Cui clan of Qinghe. Cui Hao's family, a cadet branch of the Cui clan of Qinghe, was exterminated during the Northern Wei dynasty but the other branches of the Cui clan of Qinghe survived.

During the Sui and Tang dynasties, the Cui clan of Qinghe was able to maintain its prosperity by producing a total of 12 statesmen who served as chancellors in the imperial government. Among the 12 chancellors, five were from the southern branch, two were from the elder branch, two were from the junior branch, and the remaining three each came from the Xuzhou Yanling, Qingzhou and Zhengzhou branches. The Cui family lost their political privilege by the end of the Tang dynasty and dissolved into different social classes. Cui Qun was a member of this family.

During the Tang dynasty, the Li clan of Zhao Commandery (趙郡李氏), the Cui clan of Boling, Cui clan of Qinghe, Lu clan of Fanyang, Zheng clan of Xingyang (滎陽鄭氏), Wang clan of Taiyuan (太原王氏), and Li clan of Longxi (隴西李氏) were seven political families who were legally banned from intermarriages between their families. The Cui clan of Qinghe intermarried with the Ming family of Ge County. A woman from the Lu family of Fanyang married the son of an official serving under the Northern Qi dynasty. Cui Biao, a member of the Cui family of Qinghe, had his daughter married to a son of Yang Su.

Branches 
These were the branches of the Cui clan of Qinghe and some of their cadet branches.
Eastern ancestry (東祖)
Western ancestry (西祖)
Southern ancestry (南祖)
Wushui branch (烏水房)
Elder branch of Qinghe (清河大房)
Junior branch of Qinghe (清河小房)
Qingzhou branch of Qinghe (清河青州房)
Zhengzhou branch (鄭州崔氏)
Xuzhou Yanling branch (許州鄢陵房)

Prominent Members 

 Cui Yan (崔琰, 163 - 216), official serving under first Yuan Shao and then Cao Cao
 Cui Lin (崔林, d. 245), official in Cao Wei who became one of the Three Excellencies

References 

https://searchworks.stanford.edu/view/6318443 Zhong gu shi jia da zu Qinghe Cui shi yan jiu = Zhong ... - SearchWorks
http://search.library.utoronto.ca/details?5998320 Zhong gu shi jia da zu Qinghe Cui shi yan jiu = Zhong gu shi jia da

 
Chinese clans